Patrick Sven Grimlund (29 May 1972 – 8 January 2023) was a Swedish economic advisor and  television personality, best known for participating in the TV3 show Lyxfällan.

Biography

Studies and work
Patrick Grimlund studied and graduated with a degree in economics at the Richmond University in London in 1997. Between 2006 and 2007, Grimlund studied at Stockholm University, and graduated with a degree in corporate economics. He focused on leadership coaching and economic advisor. In 2008, Grimlund was a writer for the Civilekonomernas magazine Civilekonomen. He was also a lecturer, for his coaching and economic advisor knowledge. In 2008, he started Grimgold consulting AB. In 2010, Grimlund was the co-founder of the company Coaching i näringslivet.

Television work
In 2010 and 2017, Patrick Grimlund was a presenter and economic advisor for the TV3 show Lyxfällan along with Magnus Hedberg. In 2015, he was the presenter for the Swedish version of Dragons Den for TV8.

In 2011, Grimlund participated as a celebrity in the cancer gala the Pink Ribbon gala broadcast on TV3. And in 2013, he was a guest on the Alex Schulman talkshow Schulman show for Aftonbladet-TV.

Personal life and death
Grimlund was from 2013 and until his death married to Sara Grimlund, born Goldensohn. The couple had three children. Grimlund also had a son from a previous marriage.

Patrick Grimlund died after a car crash incident in Mariefred, on 8 January 2023, at the age of 50.

References

External links 

1972 births
2023 deaths
Swedish television personalities
People from Lidingö Municipality
Road incident deaths in Sweden